Luka Hujber (born 16 June 1999 in Croatia) is a Croatian footballer who plays for Istra 1961.

References

1999 births
Living people
People from Nova Gradiška
Association football defenders
Croatian footballers
Croatian Football League players
NK Lokomotiva Zagreb players
GNK Dinamo Zagreb II players
NK Istra 1961 players
First Football League (Croatia) players